"The Flood" is a song by British pop group Take That from their sixth studio album, Progress (2010). It was released as the lead single in the United Kingdom on 7 November 2010. The song is the first to feature Robbie Williams since his return to the band in July 2010, and features both Williams and Gary Barlow on lead vocals.

The song received acclaim from critics, who praised its anthemic sound and Williams' vocals. It peaked at number 2 on the UK Singles Chart, and was a hit internationally.

Promotion
The song was placed on the Radio 1 A-Playlist for a number of weeks after its first play on radio in early October. The band appeared on X Factor result show 6 to perform "The Flood" live for the first time on 14 November, it was also the first time they had performed as a five piece in 15 years. They also performed it on Children in Need and closed the show with number-one single "Never Forget". They then sang "The Flood" on X Factor Italy on 23 November, as well as on The Voice of Holland on 27 November. Following that was Skavlan.

Then they performed it on Benissimo on 1 December. Next up was The Late Late Show in Ireland on 10 December and then they performed it live on Wetten, dass..? in Germany. They also performed "The Flood" on Strictly Come Dancing and Dance avec les stars. They later sang it on the X Factor final on 12 December, where they also sang their number 1 single "Never Forget" with the final three contestants. They closed the Royal Variety Performance with "The Flood", with their backing dancers representing the progress of man.

Critical reception
The single gained rave reviews across the media and social network sites since its first play at BBC Radio 1 with social network users and fans commenting on the single as "incredible".

During the ITV broadcast of the documentary Look Back, Don't Stare, Elton John appears to listen to an early demo of the song with the band and comments "Brilliant, do you know how big this is gonna be?" - however, this was clever video editing and the extended cut reveals Elton was actually listening to the song Underground Machine.

Digital Spy awarded the single 4 stars commenting that the single "reveals itself to be a genuinely epic pop belter". The Daily Telegraph again praised the single stating "The Flood is a stirring us-against-the-world pop anthem that blends the best of Williams' rabble rousing instincts with Gary Barlow's smooth songwriting." Orange agreed with this view, stating that "when it comes to perfect pop, they're still the masters of their game".

The Flood was nominated for an Ivor Novello Award in 2012 for best work and most performed song.

Chart performance
The single achieved commercial success in the United Kingdom and across Europe upon release, charting in more than 20 countries to date.

"The Flood" debuted in Denmark at number 7 on 22 October 2010 before moving up to 4. It remained in the Danish Singles Chart for a total of 20 weeks and was certified Gold by the IFPI. The track debuted in the Top 10 in Ireland on the Irish Singles Chart dated 11 November 2010, at number 8, but later rose to number 3 whilst also spending 15 weeks in the Irish Top 50. On 14 November 2010, the single debuted at number 2 on the UK Singles Chart with sales of 69,484 copies, and remained there the week after selling 89,917; it was held off number 1. The track has sold over 600,000 copies to date in the United Kingdom alone, being certified as Platinum, and has spent a total of eight weeks in the UK top ten and 20 weeks in the top 100.

The song peaked at number 6 in Switzerland and remained in the charts for 21 weeks, also peaking at number 14 in Austria where it spent 19 weeks in the Austrian Singles Chart. The single became the band's 16th top 40 single in Germany where it peaked at number 12 and spent 25 weeks within the German Charts and in Norway the band continued their consecutive hits with The Flood peaking inside the top 5 at number 3. In the Netherlands the single peaked at number 4 and has to date spent 16 weeks within the charts, whilst the single peaked at number 2 in Italy where it was certified Gold by the FIMI.

Music video
The music video, directed by Mat Whitecross, features the five members of the band racing against another crew in specially-made five-seater sculling boats. The band's boat is named "Progress" after the record breaking number 1 album, whilst the band wear old-fashioned white rowing kits, bearing a custom-designed Take That crest. The group is shown to be competing in a race against a younger crew and although losing the race, the group continue going past the finish line (to the confusion of the winning team) and are shown to row down the River Thames past famous London landmarks before fading away into a stormy sea. The video for the single was filmed in July 2010 on Dorney Lake in Buckinghamshire, which played host to the rowing events at the 2012 Summer Olympics, as well as on location on the River Thames.

Track listing
UK CD single
 "The Flood" – 4:51
 "The Flood" (instrumental) – 4:51

UK DVD single
 "The Flood" (Video) – 5:00
 "The Flood" (Behind the Scenes) – 2:30

UK promo single
 "The Flood" (radio edit) – 3:54
 "The Flood" (instrumental) – 4:51

 German CD single / UK iTunes package
 "The Flood" – 4:51
 "The Flood" (video) – 5:00

Charts

Weekly charts

Year-end charts

Certifications

Radio dates and release history

Radio add dates

Release history

References

Take That songs
2010 singles
Pop ballads
Rock ballads
Songs written by Gary Barlow
Songs written by Howard Donald
Songs written by Jason Orange
Songs written by Mark Owen
Songs written by Robbie Williams
Song recordings produced by Stuart Price
2010 songs
Music videos directed by Mat Whitecross